Ernest Jean Gaudin (November 10, 1879 - November 16, 1954) was a French painter, glass and mosaic artist.
 
He was the son of Félix Gaudin, from whom he bought the stained glass and mosaic studio in 1909, and was the father of Pierre Gaudin (1908-1973) and grandfather of Sylvie Gaudin. He was born in Clermont-Ferrand, France and died in Paris, France.

His Art Deco stained glass windows are found in many churches, including Amiens Cathedral.

Works
 Stained glass window in Amiens Cathedral 
 L'église Saint Louis de Rouvroy : stained glass windows
 The church of Saint-Julien, Domfront (Orne), interior decoration
 The funeral chapel of the Berny family, Guiscard (Oise) cemetery; mosaics and stained glass windows.
 The church of Limé (Aisne); mosaics.
 The church of Saint Vaast, Moreuil (Somme); mosaics.
 The Église Saint-Jean-Bosco (Paris); stained-glass windows.
 L'Église Notre-Dame des Alpes in Saint-Gervais-les-Bains; decoration.
 The crypt of the Basilica of St. Thérèse, Lisieux, (Calvados).
 The church of Notre-Dame, Rocquigny, Pas-de-Calais, stained-glass windows.

References

External links

 Photograph of the mosaic in the crypt of the Basilica of Lisieux Flickr

1879 births
1954 deaths
Mosaic artists
French glass artists
Artists from Clermont-Ferrand
20th-century French painters
20th-century French male artists
French male painters
19th-century French male artists